Leon Township is the name of some places in the U.S. state of Minnesota:

Leon Township, Clearwater County, Minnesota
Leon Township, Goodhue County, Minnesota

Minnesota township disambiguation pages